John Greenwood Barton (born 5 June 1936) is a retired British Anglican priest. He was Archdeacon of Aston from 1990 to 2003.

Barton was educated at Battersea Grammar School and the London College of Divinity. He was Assistant Curate at  St Mary Bredin, Canterbury from 1963 to 1966; Vicar of  Whitfield with West Langdon from 1966 to 1975; Vicar  of St Luke, South Kensington from 1975 to 1983; Area Dean of Chelsea from 1980 to 1983; and Chief Broadcasting Officer for the Church of England from 1983 until his appointment as Archdeacon of Aston.

References

1936 births
People educated at Battersea Grammar School
Alumni of the London College of Divinity
Archdeacons of Aston
Living people